Faust Emanuel Lang (1887–1973) was a German sculptor who settled in St Ives, Cornwall, in South West England.

Life and works
Faust Lang was born to Andreas and Lucie Lang in Oberammergau in Southern Germany. His father was a sculptor and also played St. Peter in the Passion Play in Oberammergau.

Faust emigrated to England in 1934, living in Winterslow Rectory near Salisbury, Wiltshire, with his in-laws. The family then moved to Mawgan Porth, Cornwall, in 1936 along with his wife Una Lang and son Wharton Lang. Finally in 1949 they moved to St Ives, purchasing Fauna Studio, Mount Zion, which became a base for his artistic work. He exhibited widely both nationally and internationally, submitting work to the Royal Academy in 1946/47 and numerous other galleries such as the Russell Coates Art Gallery in Bournemouth and The Medici Gallery, Old Bond Street, London. He produced a wide range of private commissions, including religious work, much of which can still be seen.

His sculptural style reflected his South German background, and he excelled in figurative subjects, both human and animal. His style was very expressive but with great attention to detail, outlining every muscle, sinew and hair in order to give a feeling of life and movement. He produced a series of figurines for Wade Ceramics before World War II.

Selected works
Figure of Christ on the Cross, St Mary Abbots Church, Kensington (in commemoration of Robert Curwin, Rector)
Figure of St. Eia in St Ives Catholic Church
Figure of Christus Regnans (Reigning Christ) in Tintagel Parish Church
Madonna and Child in Bodmin Parish Church

See also 

 Lang Sculpture Photographs of work by Faust Lang
 Pathe News Faust Lang & Wharton Lang at work in St Ives 1959

English artists
German sculptors
German male sculptors
Cornish culture
St Ives artists
Penwith
1887 births
1973 deaths
20th-century sculptors
German emigrants to the United Kingdom